Franklin Park Mall is a shopping mall in Toledo, Ohio. The anchor stores are Dillard's, Macy's, Dick's Sporting Goods, Forever 21, DSW, and JCPenney.

History
Developed by The Rouse Company, the mall opened on July 22, 1971, occupying the former site of the Franklin Airport. The mall was built using the Syncon modular building subsystems for an estimated savings of $500,000. When the mall opened, its original anchor stores were  Hudson's, J. C. Penney, and local department store Lamson Brothers. Mall concourses featured sunken courts before the entrance to each department store, skylights, and a mobile constructed by Alexander Calder in front of the Hudson's entrance.

In 1974, Lamson Brothers went bankrupt and the store was replaced by Jacobson's of Jackson, Michigan. This store was the fourteenth in the Jacobson's chain.

In 1993, Rouse significantly remodeled the mall and added a new wing anchored by the Lion Store.  In 1998 the Lion Store was renamed Dillard's, while in 2001, Hudson's was renamed Marshall Field's. The Westfield Group acquired the shopping center in early 2002, and renamed it "Westfield Shoppingtown Franklin Park", dropping the "Shoppingtown" name in June 2005.  Jacobson's went bankrupt and closed its location in early 2002, days before Westfield announced the takeover.

The former Lamson Brothers/Jacobson's was demolished in 2004 and in its place a new wing, the centerpiece of a massive $100 million renovation, opened in 2005.  It was at this time that a new National Amusements multiplex theater and Dick's Sporting Goods were built, as well as a new Food Court and Borders books. Marshall Field's became Macy's in 2006.

In 2008 Westfield held a press conference at Franklin Park to announce were shoe retailer DSW Warehouse, clothing store Old Navy, and an Ulta cosmetic salon. The stores opened as part of the  addition.

After Borders went out of business in 2011, its space became Forever 21, which relocated from a smaller store within the mall.

In fall 2013 the mall was sold to Starwood Capital Group with 7 other Westfield properties. As a result, it reverted to Franklin Park Mall.

References

Official website
Official Website

Shopping malls in the Toledo, Ohio metro area
Tourist attractions in Toledo, Ohio
Buildings and structures in Toledo, Ohio
Shopping malls established in 1971
1971 establishments in Ohio